Matt Ross-Spang is an American record producer, Grammy award winning engineer, and mixer. His credits include such artists as Jason Isbell, Margo Price, John Prine and Elvis Presley.

Life and career 
Matt Ross-Spang, born in Memphis, Tennessee, began working at the Sun Studio when he was just 16, working his way from an intern to the Chief Engineer. Wanting to capture what made Sun Studio great, Ross-Spang championed hard to find, install, and use the same period equipment that Sam Phillips engineered with from the 1950s. His 11 years of dedication to Sun, and its signature sound, garnered national attention when it was featured by Lester Holt on NBC's Nightly News and The Today Show, as well as NPR's All Things Considered.

In 2015, Ross-Spang left Sun Studio to venture out on his own as an engineer and producer. His first project post-Sun was to engineer and mix Jason Isbell's Something More Than Free for record producer Dave Cobb. This record earned him his first Grammy Award. The record broke several records debuting at #1 on the Country, Rock, Folk, and Indie Charts. It also broke Americana Radio chart records, staying #1 for over 25 weeks. The record won Grammys for Best Americana Album and Best Americana Song ("24 Frames").

Ross-Spang continued engineering for Dave Cobb on records by Mary Chapin Carpenter, Chris Isaak, The Rival Sons, Corb Lund, Lori McKenna, Brett Dennen and the album Southern Family.

Other recent releases include the latest Sheepdogs record, Future Nostalgia, and the debut album by Margo Price. Price's album, entitled Midwest Farmer's Daughter, was recorded in 2014 at Sun Studio and released on Third Man Records. Engineered, mixed and co-produced by Ross-Spang, the record debuted this year in the top 10 Billboard country charts to critical acclaim.

In 2016, Ross-Spang was hired by Sony Records to mix 18 previously unreleased songs by Elvis Presley from his historic 1976 sessions from the Jungle Room at Graceland.

Later that year, Ross-Spang mixed and engineered the Lori McKenna album, The Bird and the Rifle, which later went on to be nominated for a Grammy Award for Best American Roots Album and Best American Roots Song by the Recording Academy.

2017 has seen the release of Sean Rowe's new album, Lore, which Ross-Spang produced and engineered. American Songwriter magazine gave the record 4 out of 5 stars.

In September 2018, Ross-Spang participated in Amazon Music's first 'Produced By' series, which asks producers to develop music exclusively for Amazon customers. His contributions include tracks from Al Green, Margo Price, John Prine, Erin Rae, and William Bell.

Ross-Spang has been a regular collaborator with The Mountain Goats, engineering their album In League With Dragons (2019), and producing both Getting Into Knives (2019) and Dark in Here (2021).

In 2021, Ross-Spang opened Southern Grooves, his 3,000-square-foot recording studio. The building process started in August 2020, with acousticians Steven Durr and Matt Schlachter. The studio occupies space, on the second floor of Crosstown Concourse. The studio consists of a live room, control room, a long hallway (for reverb) echo chamber, a lounge, office, tech shop and an EMT plate room. "The undulating ceiling and lack of 90-degree angles or parallel surfaces in the live room reportedly give the impression that the space is a lot bigger than it is". Memphis Business Journal quoted, "One of the most distinctive features of Southern Grooves is the small, closet-sized echo chamber. The walls are designed at odd angles, and they're heavily plastered".

Awards and recognition
Matt Ross-Spang worked as the engineer on The Fluffy Jackets' debut album Fighting Demons featuring producer/ guitarist Manny Charlton (Nazareth) and bassist Neil Murray (Whitesnake). The album won the Best Studio Album of the Year Award for 2014, voted by listeners of The Blues Hour show in UK and France.

One year later, Ross-Spang won a Grammy Award for Jason Isbell's "Something More Than Free in 2015.

The City of Memphis named him one of its "30 under 30" Memphians in 2015

In 2016, Ross-Spang was awarded the Key to the City of Memphis.

He was featured on the Working Class Audio podcast with Matt Boudreau.

For their January/February 2017 issue, Tape Op magazine interviewed Ross-Spang about his past and the future of music production.

At the 2017 Grammy Awards, Lori McKenna's The Bird & The Rifle (engineered and mixed by Ross-Spang) was nominated for Best American Roots Album, Best American Roots Performance, and Best American Roots Song.

At the 2018 Grammy Awards, Ross-Spang received a Grammy for his work on Jason Isbell and the 400 unit's album, The Nashville Sound. The album received a Grammy Awards for Best Americana Album. Additionally, "If We Were Vampires" won the Grammy for Best American Roots Song.

At the 2018 UK Americana Awards, Emily Barker's album, Sweet Kind of Blue, was nominated for Best Album of the Year.

At the 2019 Grammy Awards, John Prine's The Tree of Forgiveness (engineered by Ross-Spang) was nominated for Best Americana Album, Best American Roots Song, 

At the 2020 Grammy Awards, Iron & Wine / Calexico received two nominations with their Ross-Spang produced album Years to Burn. That same year, Don Bryant received a nomination for Best Traditional Blues Album forYou Make Me Feel, mixed by Ross-Spang.

Selected discography

References

External links
Matt Ross-Spang Interview - NAMM Oral History Library (2016)

1987 births
Living people
Record producers from Tennessee
People from Memphis, Tennessee
American audio engineers